Xenoblade Chronicles X is a 2015 action role-playing game developed by Monolith Soft and published by Nintendo for the Wii U console. Xenoblade Chronicles X forms part of the Xeno metaseries, being a spiritual successor to Xenoblade Chronicles without any narrative connections to prior Xeno titles. Carrying over several gameplay elements from Xenoblade Chronicles, players explore the open world planet Mira, completing a variety of quests and unlocking new regions to explore and gather resources from across Mira's five continents.

Xenoblade Chronicles X takes place on the uncharted planet Mira. Following Earth's destruction during an alien war, humanity attempts to escape, with only a few ships surviving. One such ship, the colony New Los Angeles (NLA), narrowly escapes and crashes on Mira. After being rescued from a hibernation pod by a woman named Elma, the player character, a customizable Avatar, becomes a member of BLADE, which protects NLA and seeks the Lifehold - vital to their survival -  while fending off the hostile Ganglion and investigating Mira's secrets.

Beginning development after work finished on Xenoblade Chronicles, Xenoblade Chronicles X features multiple returning staff from earlier Xeno titles, including series creator Tetsuya Takahashi as executive director and scenario co-writer. The staff also included Xenoblade Chronicles director Koh Kojima and producer Shingo Kawabata, Xenoblade Chronicles scenario co-writer Yuichiro Takeda, and Xenosaga artists Kunihiko Tanaka and Kouichi Mugitani. The team set themselves the challenge of creating an expansive world for players to explore within a tight development budget. The implementation of online multiplayer both proved challenging due to the team's inexperience, and the game required a comprehensive story rewrite to recast the protagonist as a player-created avatar. The music was created by anime composer Hiroyuki Sawano.

The game was first announced in 2013 under the working title "X", set for a release date the following year, but was later delayed to 2015. The game's localization was handled by Nintendo Treehouse and 8-4, undergoing changes for its Western release. Upon release, Xenoblade Chronicles X was well received. The game received praise for its story, combat, and vast world size, while receiving some criticism for its sometimes complicated learning curve. The basic game engine and foundation work of Xenoblade Chronicles X was used in the team's next Xeno game, Xenoblade Chronicles 2.

Gameplay 

Xenoblade Chronicles X is an action role-playing video game in which the player controls a customizable avatar; they can adjust the avatar's gender, facial features, build, and voice. Working from the home hub of New Los Angeles (NLA), the avatar explores the five continents of the open world planet Mira alongside a party of companions. Quests are divided into story quests that advance the main narrative, affinity quests which strengthen bonds between the avatar and their comrades, small-scale missions which reward in-game money and additional features, and side quests taken from NLA's citizens. Accessible quests are limited based on the amount of Mira explored, which is tied to the main story's completion percentage. Completing quests and fighting enemies grants the character several types of experience points (EXP); standard EXP raises a character's health and general statistics, while Class EXP raises a character's assigned Class.

The avatar can adopt different roles within BLADE, each of which grants different advantages; Pathfinders open up new locations, Interceptors defend research teams from hostile lifeforms, Harriers actively seek hostile lifeforms, including powerful monsters called Tyrants; Reclaimers retrieve wreckage from the White Whale, Curators explore new locations and collect data for BLADE, Prospectors collect rare resources, Outfitters develop gear, and Mediators resolve conflicts among NLA's people. The avatar initially explores Mira on foot, but gains access to the transformable Skell mechs during the later half of the game after completing a specific set of quests. Skells initially come with a bipedal walking mode and a vehicle-form driving mode. Each Skell has a limited amount of fuel, and when depleted, it cannot be used until the fuel is replenished. Skells are kept at a special hangar in NLA, where they can be customized and fitted with new weapons or loaned to another party member. There are three Skell types, with increasing armor quality and fuel levels, allowing further travel and greater battle efficiency. Skells have "Insurance", used to repair and maintain the Skells. Multiple Skell models can be bought and upgraded over the course of the game.

Aside from standard enemies from among the game's antagonistic force, the party can also battle Mira's indigenous wildlife. While some creatures are docile until attacked, others will attack if they hear or see you. Upon entering battle, each character attacks with their assigned automatically to a set rhythm based on their assigned weapons; each character has health points (HP) and Tension points (TP), and a morale gauge which determines their effectiveness in battle. Attack strength varies depending on a party member's position upon attacking. Healing the party in-battle can be done with types of Arts, but is mainly done using a quick-time event (QTE) tied to the Soul Voice system, a line-up of commands which trigger a Soul Challenge QTE, healing the party or granting positive effects. Successfully completing a Soul Challenge raises the party's morale. If a battle is successfully completed, knocked-out party members will revive and the party will recover HP. If the avatar is knocked out, they can either teleport to a safe location or be revived if the other party members defeated all engaged enemies within thirty seconds.

The party consists of the avatar and up to three party members controlled by artificial intelligence. Each character has a melee weapon, a ranged weapon, and a selection of abilities called Arts. After raising a character's level from gaining EXP, new Arts are unlocked, with Class-based Arts unlocking upon raising a Class' rank. EXP portions can also be used to strengthen Arts. Arts have different abilities, ranging from standard or powerful attacks, supporting the party, and inflicting or lifting status ailments. Once used, each Art has a cool-down timer, taking a variable amount of time depending on the Art used. A secondary cool-down timer activates when the ability becomes available, triggering additional effects if the timer is allowed to refill. TP rise with each normal attack, and are used to trigger special Arts ranging from powerful attacks to reviving fallen allies. When their TP meter is high enough, a character enters "Overdrive", which increases attack power and decreases cool-down time. Skell battle mechanics are identical to those of the avatar and party, with additional abilities including raising the defense of party members not equipped with Skells. If the Skell is defeated, it is evacuated to NLA for repair, with the status of both party and Skell determined by a final QTE triggered at the end of an unsuccessful battle, with a perfect trigger resulting in additional status buffs to the party.

In addition to the single-player campaign, Xenoblade Chronicles X features a multiplayer element. After connecting online, players can loan their avatars for other player's parties in their games, forming units dubbed Squads. These Squads can be up to 32-players strong, enabling the sharing of reports and active participation in battles in other player's worlds. Squads can take part in "Tasks", time-limited random missions where players collect a set number of resources from Mira's environment. Completing Tasks is rewarded with items and equipment. Some multi-player missions pit parties against a Global Nemesis, an exceptionally powerful monster. Fast travel options are unlocked when new areas are discovered, accessed through both special red seats in the environment and BLADE outposts. Functions related to mapping Mira, fast travel points, adjusting character equipment and messages related to single-player and multi-player components are handled through the Wii U GamePad. The game is also compatible with the console's Off TV Play function.

Synopsis

Setting and characters 
Xenoblade Chronicles X is unconnected to any previous game in the Xeno series, although there are thematic and aesthetic references. After Earth is caught in the crossfire of an alien war, humanity escapes on spaceships — only a few ships make it off the planet, one of them being the White Whale, containing the city New Los Angeles (NLA). The game takes place on Mira, an uncharted world far away from Earth where the White Whale crash-lands: NLA becomes the center of human activity and commerce. Mira is divided into five continents — Primordia, which has the most Earth-like environment; Noctilum, covered by forests and filled with bioluminescent lifeforms; Oblivia, dominated by desert and ancient ruins; Sylvalum, a pale landscape clouded in mist and dominated by large plants and rock formations; and Cauldros, a volcanic land controlled by the Ganglion.

The main character is a player-created avatar whose body type, appearance, and voice can be chosen from a variety of options. The avatar becomes a member of BLADE (Builders of the Legacy After the Destruction of Earth). Joining the avatar on their missions is Elma, the leader of BLADE and Colonel of NLA's Skell forces; Lin Lee Koo, BLADE's engineer and a girl genius who created and maintains NLA's Skell mechs; and Lao Huang, a former US Army officer with a cool exterior.

Plot 
Xenoblade Chronicles X opens as humanity, warned of its impending destruction in the crossfire between two warring alien races, constructs interstellar arks to escape Earth. However, only a few arks escape the destruction, including the White Whale. Two years after launching, the White Whale is attacked and transported to Mira. During the crash-landing, the Lifehold—a device containing the majority of the human colonists—is separated from the White Whale, with lifepods containing colonists being scattered across Mira. The avatar is awoken from a lifepod by Elma and brought back to New Los Angeles. While suffering from amnesia, the avatar joins BLADE, working with Elma and Lin to recover more lifepods and search for the Lifehold. During their missions across Mira, BLADE encounters multiple alien races, learning that those attacking them are part of the Ganglion coalition, an alliance of races led by the Ganglion race, who are intent on destroying humanity.

During one mission, the avatar is wounded, revealing that they are in a robot body. All the people of NLA are in robot bodies called Mimeosomes, with their true bodies held within the Lifehold. The White Whale's power supply is depleting without the Lifehold, meaning the Mimeosomes will eventually shut down, killing the human population. BLADE fight off multiple attempts to destroy the White Whale and the Lifehold, eventually dissolving the alliance between the Ganglion and their allies. Due to his bitterness against NLA's leaders for abandoning his family on Earth, Lao attempts to betray the White Whale to the Ganglion, but is persuaded otherwise and gives them the information needed to find the Lifehold. Other missions also reveal that humanity are descended from the Samaarians, an other-dimensional alien race who once controlled the Ganglion.

Within the Lifehold, BLADE discovers a pool of genetic material for recreating Earth's lifeforms and restoring humanity. Elma explains that their human bodies were destroyed with Earth, but their memories and consciousnesses are preserved in the Lifehold's computers for transfer into newly created bodies. Due to the plan's questionable ethics, this decision was kept secret from the general population. Luxaar attacks the group, but Lao fatally stabs him. The two fall into the pool of genetic material causing Luxaar and Lao to merge. BLADE is reluctantly forced to kill them. Before dying, Lao reveals from Luxaar's memories that humanity's DNA was designed by their Samaarian ancestors to destroy the Ganglion using a genetic failsafe. Though Lao dies, Elma assures the group that the Lifehold can revive him. With the Lifehold power restored, Elma deactivates her Mimeosome and reveals her true form as an alien. A narration by Lin reveals that Elma visited Earth thirty years before the Ganglion arrived, giving humanity their means of escape. In a post-credits scene, a team led by Elma discover that the Lifehold's databases containing humanity's memories were destroyed upon impact with Mira. Elma speculates that Mira is somehow preserving humanity. Lao is then seen unconscious on a beach, waking when approached by a cloaked figure.

Development 
Xenoblade Chronicles X was developed by Japanese development company Monolith Soft, with Tetsuya Takahashi forming the original concept and serving as the game's executive director. Following the completion of Xenoblade Chronicles for the Wii in 2011, Takahashi approached Nintendo producer Hitoshi Yamagami and asked if he could develop a new science fiction-themed role-playing game built upon the systems of Xenoblade Chronicles. Yamagami and Nintendo were willing, and talks turned towards what Takahashi and Monolith Soft could do on Nintendo's Wii U console. Xenoblade Chronicles directors Genki Yokota of Nintendo and Koh Kojima of Monolith Soft returning in their original roles. The producers were Shingo Kawabata of Monolith Soft and Hitoshi Yamagami of Nintendo. Discussions about how to realize Xenoblade Chronicles X went on for around six months. While planned for release early in the Wii U's life cycle, the planned release date was pushed back due to development issues. They later commented that it was a challenge fitting the entire game onto a single Wii U game disc, with Kawabata commenting that the game "barely fits" onto the 32 gigabyte disc. Xenoblade Chronicles X was Monolith Soft's first high-definition video game. To help cope with this first, the team decided against using cutting-edge technology when designing the game. The team used the lessons and experience from their time developing Xenoblade Chronicles, in addition to setting limits upon what they did during production; a specified self-imposed limitation was not using middleware to speed up the production process.

The battle system was based upon the basic mechanics of that used in Xenoblade Chronicles, but with an increased sense of speed to make it feel more like an action game. Takahashi described creating the battle system one of the main challenges of development. The complete removal of "healer" classes from the system was because Takahashi felt people quickly grew tired of this role, which partly served as inspiration for the command-based "Soul Voice" system. Another goal for Takahashi was to encourage active criticism from players that he could use to improve his later work, as it felt he had received too little criticism for Xenoblade Chronicles. While many role-playing games tried to be accessible, Xenoblade Chronicles X was tailored towards the hardcore players of the genre, while also presenting the many layers of information to players an understandable and manageable way. The online functionality initially used very "basic" technology due to the team's inexperience with high-definition and online development, but with development help from Nintendo the current online multiplayer structure was created. The multiplayer segments also helped counteract the feeling of isolation players would experience exploring the game's world. The online functions were only incorporated halfway through development. The team focused on making the online mode "loosely connected" so that players can feel the presence of others. However, due to the game's role-playing elements, they also consciously made it for players to focus on playing alone without any disruption.

Design 
Creating Mira was the first priority when full development on the game began, mirroring the design of Xenoblade Chronicles. The team initially envisioned the story taking place over several different planets, but this was discarded as stretching out the possible content over several worlds would limit the experience for players. After evaluating their content plans, they settled on a single planet with five continents. Creating an open world game was part of the team's goal when designing the game. A key part of creating Mira's continents was using a limited number of assets to create varied environments. When conceiving the game structure, Takahashi drew inspiration from role-playing games from Europe and North America. When designing the open world structure, the team did not install the entire space on the hard disk as the Wii U did not allow for direct installation, instead tuning the open world so it ran smoothly without installing. The game used an extensive library of sound effects, for which the team brought in external company Sound Racer, who had worked on multiple video game franchises including Xenosaga and Final Fantasy. Sound effect work was produced by Shojiro Nakaoka.

The game map was an estimated five times larger than that of Xenoblade Chronicles, which proved problematic especially during the debugging phase. The open world was proving so problematic that at one point the team were considering scrapping it completely. The hexagonal map structure, with unlockable information points, was designed to solve the problem of players making their way through large fields. The restrictive nature of the main story quests was designed so players could be eased into the expansive nature of Mira. The choice of Los Angeles as the model for the game's hub city was inspired by Takahashi's liking for the city; his initial idea of modelling the hub after New York City was scrapped due to budgetary constraints in creating the necessary tall buildings. Creating the environment of NLA proved problematic due to the console's memory limitations, and the team worked especially hard on decreasing load times and ensuring collision detection worked properly.

The artwork and character designs for the game was worked on by a number of different artists. The main character templates and main cast were created by Kunihiko Tanaka, the main artist for the Xenosaga games. Tanaka was brought on board to bring out the Xeno elements of the game. A core part of the art team was Kouichi Mugitani, who provided character illustrations for Xenosaga Episode III and worked as production designer for all three Xenosaga titles. Allied mecha designs were handled by Takayuki Yanase, who had previously worked on the anime Ghost in the Shell: Arise and Mobile Suit Gundam 00, along with the video game Metal Gear Rising: Revengeance. Enemy mechs were designed by Yasushi Suzuki, who had previously worked on Sin and Punishment and its sequel Star Successor. Alien NPC characters were designed by Raita Kazama, who also helped design Mira's primitive fauna. Yoko Tsukamoto, an artist for Lord of Vermilion and Xenoblade Chronicles, was brought in to add fantasy elements to the world, while additional designs for enemies native to Mira were created by Takashi Kojo. Weapons were designed by Hideyuki Matsumoto, who had worked on both the Xenosaga and Front Mission series. Background art design was outsourced to Kusanagi, a company whose previous art-based work included Ni no Kuni: Dominion of the Dark Djinn. The large number of artists ensured diversity among the alien races. The game's art director was Norihiro Takami.

Creating the large flora and fauna of Mira was difficult as the team required both passive and combat situations for them. While designing each creature and race to be alien to lifeforms from Earth, they also wanted to create familiar silhouettes so they would appear "familiar and exotic at the same time in a way that [is] unsettling". The human armor designs and the alien Wrothian race drew inspiration from samurai and their armor. The concept for the Skell mechs was a machine switching between a humanoid and vehicular form. Their designs consciously drew influence from the Gundam franchise. The size of the Skells (between nine and ten meters high in-game) was calculated as the best human-to-robot size ratio when taking the game's combat scenarios into account. The Skells were an intentional callback to the mechs featured in Takahashi's first Xeno title Xenogears, with the mechanics present in Xenoblade Chronicle X echoing scrapped gameplay ideas from Xenogears. Another design callback featured in the game were the Lifehold pods, shaped similarly to monolith objects from earlier Xeno titles.

Scenario 
Takahashi created most of the main scenario himself, working on the script alongside Xenoblade Chronicles co-writer Yuichiro Takeda and Gundam series writer Kazuho Hyodo. Takahashi and Takeda decided they could not write the entire story, estimated at the time as substantially larger than Xenoblade Chronicles. On advice from Takeda, he brought in Hyodo. Due to Hyodo's extensive involvement in science fiction stories, Takahashi felt confident leaving much of the work to him. The choice of a science fiction setting was influenced by Takahashi's wish to do something different from the fantasy setting of Xenoblade Chronicles. Xenoblade Chronicles X was the first time Hyodo had worked on a video game. One of the main goals for Takahashi was having humans and the robot Skells coexisting and functioning in the world. Due to the scale and experimental nature of the game, the Monolith Soft team made an effort to move away from the philosophical storylines their company had become known for with previous titles. Speaking about his goals for the game, Takahashi felt that he had finally created what he had wanted to since first founding Monolith Soft in 1999.

After foundation work had been completed for Mira, the main focus turned towards creating the game's scenario. From there, Takahashi and Kojima had several meetings about the story with Takeda, Hyodo and Yokota. Takahashi had already written a large amount of the plot beforehand, with its size being compared to a novel by Kojima. Takeda carefully picked out the stories that fit with the game's content and scale and turned them into scripts. As Hyodo wrote several quest scenarios, he was approved by the staff members to create additional characters. Despite Takeda preferring middle-aged male characters, he thought it would be a good idea to recruit Hyodo for young female characters with important roles. According to Takeda, the scenario including the main story and quests took about a year and a half to write. For the cast, the team gathered what they described as an "exceptional" voice cast, who were highly professional during recording despite the high work load of recording the lengthy script. The team felt the game should continue the tradition from Xenoblade Chronicles of having characters talk during battle as it made the original game stand out. Compared to 3,000 battle lines from the original, the number of battle dialogues increased to 11,000 lines for this game; Kojima thought that it was a misprint when he first saw the word count. The total voice work was four times that of Xenoblade Chronicles, resulting in some of the actors losing their voices during recording of battle lines.

The scenario initially had a set main character with their own narrative, but midway through development the online mode was introduced, and the team decided to rework the story to accommodate a player-created avatar. Takeda said it was a challenge to adjust the story from a pre-defined protagonist to avatars as the main character, which drastically changed the flow of the story.  The changes resulted in several proposed characters, including the original lead and a proposed villain dubbed the "Black Knight" being cut; the Black Knight made a minor cameo in the final game during the post-credits ending. The game's title had multiple meanings, which varied between regions. Despite carrying the "Xenoblade" title, Xenoblade Chronicles X was not a sequel, but instead a spiritual successor carrying over the basic themes of the original Xenoblade Chronicles. For this reason, it was not titled as a numerical sequel. The "X" designation stands for "cross" in the Japanese release, which stood for both the meeting of different races in the game's story and the interaction of players online during gameplay. For the English version, the "X" symbol stood for the unknown, and also represented alien life and the unknown planet of Mira, in addition to the interaction in battle between humans and the Skells.

Music 
The game's soundtrack was handled by Hiroyuki Sawano. Sawano had earned acclaim for his work on the soundtracks for multiple anime series including Attack on Titan, Guilty Crown and Kill la Kill. Takahashi had been a long-time fan of Sawano, so he personally insisted on having Sawano compose for this game. Sawano was more than willing to discuss the project when Takahashi suggested it. When they first met, Takahashi showed Sawano a concept video for the game, which provided the inspiration for Sawano's subsequent work. Sawano created the music based on the musical selections and resources provided by Monolith Soft staff, before working on the music in his own studio.

Once he had finished work on the theme demos, Sawano created the score for orchestra and band. He created the broader orchestral elements on his computer, adding the smaller layers and elements himself so he had complete control over how the score evolved. To help with this, he went to a music copyist and had them create scores for each individual instrument. After creating the main theme and the core musical themes, he then moved on to the rest of the soundtrack—estimated at over ninety tracks—over three different periods during production. Due to Takahashi's liking for Sawano's music, Sawano had the freedom to stick to his musical style. The score was directed and co-produced by Legendoor's Yasushi Horiguchi, who was brought on board the project alongside Sawano.

While Xenoblade Chronicles featured only one vocal theme, Xenoblade Chronicles X featured enough that it was considered rather high for genre standards. During early discussions about the game's music, Sawano and Takahashi thought it would be fun to include a large number of vocal themes. Sawano brought in several vocalists to create these tracks. The vocalists included rapper David Whitaker, singers Mika Kobayashi, Yumiko Inoue, Aimee Blackschleger, Cyua, mpi, and Sayulee. The ending theme, "Your Voice", was sung by Kobayashi. The lyrics for all vocal tracks were written by Whitaker, mpi and Rie. They had all worked with Sawano on previous projects. Sawano said that Xenoblade Chronicles X had the highest number of vocal tracks of any project to date.

An official soundtrack album, Xenoblade X Original Soundtrack, was released on May 20, 2015. It was published by Defstar Records and distributed by Sony Music Entertainment Japan. The game's music was arranged into 55 tracks. The album received mixed reviews from music critics.

Release 
Nintendo confirmed in 2012 that Monolith Soft was developing a new title for the Wii U. The game was officially announced in a Nintendo Direct in January 2013 under the working title "X". At E3 2013, it was announced that it was scheduled for a 2014 release. The game's official title and updated release window of 2015 was announced at E3 2014. In an interview following the game's Japanese release, Kojima expressed sorrow at the amount of work the game had provided for Mario Club, Nintendo's in-house testing group. Then-CEO Satoru Iwata commented that he froze for a moment when he first saw the group's testing fee for the game.

By November 2014, the game was entering the final stages of production. While Nintendo had decided not to create an official website at that point, Monolith Soft decided to create their own website for the game. While they initially thought Nintendo would object, they were allowed to go ahead with creating and maintaining the website. Monolith Soft also created an official Twitter account for the game alongside the new website. Xenoblade Chronicles X was published in Japan by Nintendo on April 29, 2015. The Japanese version came with standard and a hardware bundle featuring a version of the game with a reversible cover, black Wii U console and gamepad, and an artbook. Alongside the game's release, downloadable content (DLC) was made available for purchase, featuring four new characters with accompanying stories split between three quests, and optional data packs to speed loading times. The data packs were provided so that when flying Skells portions of the world could be loaded from storage to make for a smoother playing experience.

Localization 
A worldwide release for Xenoblade Chronicles X was confirmed at E3 2013. Its Western release dates were announced at E3 2015, the month following its Japanese release. In contrast to other prominent Wii U titles Nintendo had scheduled for that year, Xenoblade Chronicles X was not prominently advertised. This was due to the game having an established audience among both role-playing fans in general and fans of the Xeno series. Xenoblade Chronicles X was released in North America and Europe on 4 December 2015. In Australia and New Zealand, the game was released on 5 December. The additional characters released as paid DLC in Japan were released as part of the game in the West. Following its release, Xenoblade Chronicles X received software updates via download: the first was minor adjustments to in-game text, while the second added Spanish and French subtitles.

The Western localization was handled collaboratively by Nintendo Treehouse and 8-4, a company whose previous localization credits include Fire Emblem Awakening and Tales of Vesperia. Due to the substantial size of the game and its voice acting, localization proved challenging for Nintendo. As with the Japanese version, external studio Sound Racer worked on the sound environment. For its Western release, the game received multiple changes; the mech's names were changed from "Dolls" to "Skells", a character customization slider for altering breast size of female avatars was completely removed, and character Lin's bikini outfit was removed. In an interview, Lin's voice actress Cassandra Lee Morris said that Lin was given an older voice compared to her Japanese counterpart as the team felt a young-sounding voice would grate on players over the course of the game. In the wake of fan criticism following the game's release, both Morris and Takahashi defended the changes as necessary parts of the localization process.

Reception 

Japanese gaming publication Dengeki gave the game a positive review, referring to it as a masterpiece; they praised the gameplay, detailed world, story direction, and music, and said it has a "very high degree of perfection". Japanese gaming magazine Famitsu gave Xenoblade Chronicles X  a score of 34/40, with scores of 9, 9, 8 and 8 from the four reviewers; they praised the gameplay, plot, large open world, and sense of freedom, but two of the reviewers criticized it for having an abundance of cutscenes.

Upon its Western release, Xenoblade Chronicles X earned an aggregated review score of 84/100 at Metacritic, indicating "generally favorable" reception. Nintendo Life praised the game's battle system, deep upgrade pathways, vast world size, and graphics, but criticized the occasional difficulty spike and fetch quest. IGN scored it 8.2/10, stating that, "Out in the wilderness, Xenoblade Chronicles X presents seemingly endless reasons to fight and wander the planet.", and that "Xenoblade Chronicles X is a massive RPG with enough surface area, sub quests, and customization to keep you busy". However, the game was criticized by IGN with a narrative that "makes important moments feel bland, with low production value that robs emotional scenes of any dramatic weight". Nintendo World Report scored it 9.5/10, stating that it is "required playing for anyone with the slightest inclination toward RPGs, and if you need to buy the system then do it" as it is "an essential part of the Wii U library."

Destructoid scored it 9/10, stating that it "feels like an MMO world I've been living in for several weeks now" though the "more grimdark theme isn't quite as charming as the original Xenoblade, but everything else makes up for it." GameSpot stated that, of "all the open-world games to come out this year, Xenoblade Chronicles X may be the most formidable" as a "truly enormous game, both in scale and scope," praising the landscapes, creature design, unlockables and quests, combat, and character progression and customization, but criticizing the inconsistent soundtrack, ambiguous systems, and disappointing story. Eurogamer said it is "Japanese RPG-making at its most ambitious and determined."

Sales 
The game was the third best-selling game during its release week in Japan, selling around 85,000 copies. During its second week and third week, it sold over 11,000 and 2,000 copies respectively. In addition to its physical copies, the game garnered nearly 23,000 digital copies during May 2015. It was the most downloaded title in Japan for the month of May, largely surpassing other titles such as Minecraft, Bravely Second: End Layer, and The Witcher 3: Wild Hunt. As of June 2015, 110,000 physical copies had been sold. By the end of the year, a total of 114,665 were sold in Japan.

Upon its release in the United Kingdom, the game managed to secure 28th place in the charts. Despite its modest position, the game's launch sales was 73% higher than its predecessor had been in the same region. In France, the game sold over 40,000 physical copies after two weeks. In the United States, the game sold over 200,000 physical copies during the month of December, nearly doubling the game's then-lifetime sales in Japan.

Legacy 

The foundation work for Xenoblade Chronicles X provided a base architecture upon which the staff were able to build for the next Xeno game for the Nintendo Switch, resulting in a far shorter development time than previous Xenoblade titles. The next game, titled Xenoblade Chronicles 2 and released worldwide on December 1, 2017, acts as a thematic sequel to Xenoblade Chronicles, shifting back to a story-driven approach after the focus on gameplay for Xenoblade Chronicles X. Elma was released as a recruitable "Blade" for the expansion pass of Xenoblade Chronicles 2.

Future 
Koh Kojima, the game director of the Xenoblade Chronicles series wishes to develop a sequel to Xenoblade Chronicles X. As of 2018, Tetsuya Takahashi says that while a sequel to Xenoblade Chronicles X is possible, Monolith Soft may take the series to a completely new direction. Despite Takahashi's desires to bring Xenoblade Chronicles X to the Nintendo Switch, he says that "money" is an issue and that reconfiguring it to the Switch would be difficult due to the game's massive size.

Notes

References

External links 
 

2015 video games
Fiction set in 2054
Action role-playing video games
Japanese role-playing video games
Video games about mecha
Monolith Soft games
Multiplayer and single-player video games
Nintendo games
Nintendo Network games
Open-world video games
Video games developed in Japan
Video games featuring protagonists of selectable gender
Video games featuring non-playable protagonists
Video games set in the 2050s
Video games scored by Hiroyuki Sawano
Video games set on fictional planets
Video games with downloadable content
Wii U eShop games
Wii U games
Wii U-only games
Xenoblade Chronicles
Fiction set in 2056